Bafing–Falémé is a Ramsar wetland of Guinea.

References

Ramsar sites in Guinea